Vincenzo Bruno (born 2 July 1933) is an Italian coxswain. He competed at the 1960 Summer Olympics in Rome with the men's coxed pair where they came fifth.

References

1933 births
Living people
Italian male rowers
Olympic rowers of Italy
Rowers at the 1960 Summer Olympics
Sportspeople from Turin
Coxswains (rowing)
European Rowing Championships medalists